Peysara may refer to:
 Peysara, Talesh
 Peysara, Kargan Rud, Talesh County